Ömer Zülfü Livaneli (born 20 June 1946), is a Turkish musician, author, poet, and politician.
 
Livaneli was imprisoned several times during the 1971 Turkish coup d'état because of his political views and had to leave Turkey in 1972 and went on exile. He lived in Stockholm, Paris, Athens, and New York where he met and collaborated with artists and intellectuals such as Elia Kazan, Arthur Miller, James Baldwin, and Peter Ustinov among others. Livaneli returned to Turkey in 1984.

His works and cultural and political activities and contributions to world peace were recognized by UNESCO in 1995 when he was appointed Goodwill Ambassador to UNESCO. He quit this UNESCO post in 2016 to protest the Turkish State's damage to the historic Kurdish Old Town of Diyarbakir. He served a term in the Turkish Parliament as well as in the Council of Europe.

Personal life
Livaneli's real name is Ömer Zülfü Livanelioğlu. He comes from a family of Georgian descent. His father was a judge and later president of the Turkish Supreme Court. He has four brothers and a sister. His mother died at the age of 38, when he was 20, and his father later remarried. His wife's name is Ülker and his daughter's name is Aylin; she was born in Ankara, Turkey. Ülker is a translator.

In March 2020, Livaneli announced that he and his wife had become infected with coronavirus during their visit to New York in February during the COVID-19 pandemic. He further stated that after receiving treatment both of them had fully recovered and were quarantined in Turkey.

Musical career
Livaneli was trying to go to Europe because he had gone to jail two times. For his first album, he didn't use his current name, Zülfü Livaneli. Instead, he used the name "Ozanoglu". Yet he did not get to the point where he wanted to be, therefore, he started using his current name, Zülfü Livaneli, on his new album, Chants Révolutionnaires Turcs (Turkish Revolutionary songs) in 1971 or 1973. When he was in Europe, his brother Ferhat informed him about how his songs were being sung by everyone in Turkey while they were protesting the government. Livaneli then made an album called Nazim Türküsü. The album turned into the well-renowned poet Nâzım Hikmet's poems to music and it became and stayed at the top hit on albums album for 48 weeks. 

Livaneli has composed some three hundred songs, a rhapsody recorded by London Symphony Orchestra–, and a ballet. His compositions have reached cult status nationwide and have been performed by artists such as Joan Baez, Maria Farantouri, Maria del Mar Bonet, Udo Lindenberg, Haris Alexiou, Jocelyn B. Smith, and Kate Westbrook. He has also written five plays and thirty film soundtracks. Among these soundtracks are the soundtrack for "Yol" (The Path), directed by Yilmaz Güney and winner of the Golden Palm in Cannes Film Festival, "The Herd", directed by Yılmaz Güney and Zeki Öktem, and "Shirin's Wedding" by German director Helma Sanders-Brahms. He has produced albums and performed with Mikis Theodorakis and Maria Farantouri, and he has also collaborated with Manos Hatzidakis, Giora Feidman, Inti-Illimani and Ángel Parra. His 1997 Ankara concert was attended by no less than 500 thousand people. In 2010, he sang 'Mothers of The Disappeared' with Bono at U2's concert in Istanbul, Turkey, which was U2's first-ever concert in Istanbul. Livaneli has been distinguished with the awards Best Album of the Year (Greece), the Edison Award (Holland), and Best Album of the Year (Music Critics Guild of Germany), and the "Premio Luigi Tenco" Best Songwriter Award, San Remo, Italy, in 1999, among others. 

In 1986, the Greek composer Mikis Theodorakis met Livaneli. Together, they produced an album called Güneş Topla Benim İçin (Gather The Sun For Me). After the album was released in Turkey, it peaked in the Turkish music market. At that time Livaneli met Ahmet Kaya, another folk singer. Livaneli reached his first musical peak in the 1980s. The London Orchestra performed with Livaneli in 1998, and in 1999, UNESCO assisted Livaneli on the release of that album.

Political life
Apart from his career as an author and poet, Livaneli was highly influential in Turkish politics over the last thirty years. In the 1994 Turkish local elections, he was nominated as candidate for mayorship of Istanbul by Social Democratic Populist Party but his bid failed. In the 2002 Turkish general election, Livaneli was elected to the Türkiye Büyük Millet Meclisi (Grand National Assembly of Turkey) as a Deputy for Istanbul for the Republican People's Party (CHP). Livaneli resigned from the CHP in early 2005, however, in protest at "CHP's non-democratic and authoritarian system of politics". Livaneli was a member of the Turkish parliament for one term. 

During his political career in Ankara, Livaneli presented a legislative proposal for amending Article 301 of the Turkish Penal Code. The amendment proposed that the concept of "Turkishness" should be replaced with that of the "Turkish nation" which would put an emphasis on the concept of "nation" which, as formulated by the Republic, unites under its umbrella people of different origins. This amendment aimed to reduce stress associated with the notion of Turkish race.

Besides this, in 2006 he presented a proposal to the National Assembly demanding that a commission be established to investigate the reasons for increasing violence and fanaticism among the youth; his proposal was accepted.

Following his 2005 resignation from the party membership, Livaneli continued in his position in the Grand National Assembly as an independent until the end of that term. He did not take part in the 2007 Turkish elections and appears politically inactive. He has since concentrated on his art and books.

Livaneli was a daily contributor as a columnist in the newspapers Sabah, Vatan, and Milliyet.

Films
Livaneli directed four feature films: Iron Earth, Copper Sky, Mist, Shahmaran and Veda. His film Iron Earth, Copper Sky was screened in the Un Certain Regard section at the 1987 Cannes Film Festival. Veda that based on the life of Mustafa Kemal Atatürk is the last film written and directed by Zülfü Livaneli.

One of the most acclaimed Turkish films of the decade – and one of the first narrative films to tackle the highly charged subject of honor killings – Bliss was originally adopted from Livaneli's best-seller novel. The film, reviewed by New York Times as a consistently gripping, visually intoxicating film and standing as a landmark of contemporary Turkish cinema.

Literature 
Livaneli turned his focus to writing after gaining notability with his contemporary music career. Published in 1978, his first collection of short stories entitled A Child in Purgatory was turned into a movie by Swedish and German TV. Livaneli is known for his novels that interweave diverse social and historical backgrounds, figures, and incidents, such as in Bliss which won the Barnes & Noble's Discovery of Great New Writers Award in 2006, and in his Serenade for Nadia, Leyla's House, and My Brother's Story, which were all translated into 37 languages and won numerous Turkish and International literary awards. His novels have been turned into theatrical films, stage plays, and operas.

Publications
 Arafat'ta Bir Çocuk (A Child in Purgatory) (1978)
 Orta Zekalılar Cenneti (The Heaven of the Mediocre) (1991)
 Diktatör ve Palyaço (The Dictator and the Clown) (1992)
 Sosyalizm Öldü mü? (Is Socialism Dead?) (1994)
 Engereğin Gözündeki Kamaşma (The Eunuch Of Constantinople) (1996)
 Bir Kedi, Bir Adam, Bir Ölüm (Memory Of Snow) (2001)
 Mutluluk (Bliss) (2002)
 Gorbaçov'la Devrim Üstüne Konuşmalar (Conversations With Gorbachov On Revolution) (2003)
 Leyla'nın Evi (Leyla's House) (2006)
 Son Ada (The Last Island) (2008)
 Sevdalim Hayat (Sevdalim Hayat) (2009)
 Sanat Uzun, Hayat Kısa (Art is Long, Life is Short) (2010)
 Serenad (Serenade) (2011)
 Edebiyat Mutluluktur (Literature is Bliss) (2012)
 Kardeşimin Hikayesi (My Brother's Story) (2013)
 Son Ada'nın Çocukları  (Last Island's Kids) (2014)
 Konstantiniyye Oteli   (Constantinople hotel) (2015)
 Elia ile Yolculuk (2017)
 Huzursuzluk (2017)
 Rüzgârlar Hep Gençtir (2019)

Partial discography
 Chants Révolutionnaires Turcs (Turkish Revolutionary songs ) – 1973
 Yasak Plak – 1971–1974
 Eşkıya Dünyaya Hükümdar Olmaz(Thug World Ruler No way ) – 1976
 Merhaba (Hello!) – 1977
 Nazım Türküsü (Nazim's Song) – 1978
 The Bus (OST) – 1978
 Alamanya Beyleri – 1979
 Atlının Türküsü (The Horsemen Song) – 1979
 Günlerimiz (Our Days) – 1980
 İnce Memet Türküsü (Thin Memet Song) – 1980
 Anadoluyum Ben( I Am A Anatolian) – 1981
 Maria Farandouri Söylüyor Zülfü Livaneli (Maria Farandouri Singing Livaneli) – 1982
 Yol (The Way) (Soundtrack) – 1983
 Eine Auswahl (A selection ) – 1983
 Ada (Island) – 1983–1984
 İstanbul Konseri (Istanbul Concert) – 1984
 Güneş Topla Benim İçin (Gather The Sun For Me) – 1986
 Livaneli / 10 Yılın Ezgisi (10 Melodies of the Year)– 1986
 Zor Yıllar (Difficult Year) – 1987
 Hoşgeldin Bebek (Welcome Baby) – 1987
 Gökyüzü Herkesindir (Sky Belongs to Everybody) – 1988
 Soundtracks – 1988
 Crossroads (New Age) – 1991
 Saat 4 Yoksun (Hour 4 Not Here) – 1992
 Sevgiyle (With Love) −1994
 Neylersin – 1994
 Yangın Yeri (The Place in Fire) – 1996
 Janus (Symphonic Poems) – 1996
 Livaneli & Theodorakis : Together – 1997
 Nefesim Nefesine (I breathe the breath) – 1998
 New Age Rhapsody, London Symphony Orchestra Plays Livaneli – 1998–1999
 Unutulmayanlar (Unforgettable) – 1999
 İlk Türküler (First Songs) – 2001
 Hayata Dair (About Life) – 2005
 Suyun Belleği (The Memory of Water) – 2005
 Efsane Konserler (Best Concerts) – 2006
 35. Yıl Konseri (35. Year Concert – 2008
 Gökkuşağı Gönder Bana (Send Me a Rainbow) – 2013
 Livaneli 50. Yıl "Bir Kuşaktan Bir Kuşağa – 2016

See also
:Category:Works by Zülfü Livaneli

References

External links
 
 Official website in English
 Official website in Turkish
 Zülfü Livaneli – Préliminaires du premier disque "Chants révolutionnaires turcs"

1946 births
Living people
Turkish people of Georgian descent
People from Ilgın
Social Democratic Populist Party (Turkey) politicians
Republican People's Party (Turkey) politicians
Best Music Score Golden Orange Award winners
Golden Orange Life Achievement Award winners
TED Ankara College Foundation Schools alumni
Turkish columnists
Turkish film directors
Turkish male singers
Turkish poets
Turkish writers
Turkish socialists
Deputies of Istanbul
Vatan people
Milliyet people
Sabah (newspaper) people
UNESCO Goodwill Ambassadors
Turkish novelists